Mbaracayú is a town in the Alto Paraná department of Paraguay.

Sources 
World Gazeteer: Paraguay – World-Gazetteer.com

Populated places in the Alto Paraná Department